Ernest Keith Smith, known mononymously as Ernest (stylized in ERNEST), is an American country music singer. After writing songs for  Morgan Wallen, Jake Owen, Florida Georgia Line, Thomas Rhett and Chris Lane, he signed a recording contract with Big Loud in 2019.

Biography
Ernest Keith Smith was born and raised in Nashville, Tennessee. He took an interest in hip hop music at an early age, citing the Space Jam soundtrack and a compact disc of Eminem songs given to him by a friend as his main influences. At age 19, he suffered a heart attack brought on by a viral infection, and developed a drug addiction while in college playing JUCO baseball. After recovering, he moved back to Nashville and began writing and recording songs, in the Bro Country style with Matt Royer, the brother of his now wife, who owned a recording studio. This association led to him co-writing the title track of Florida Georgia Line's 2016 album Dig Your Roots. The following year, recording under the mononym Ernest, he began to cut country rap singles: "Dopeman" and "Bad Boy".

In addition, Ernest began writing songs for Chris Lane and Jake Owen. This led to him signing a recording contract with Big Loud, the label to which both Owen and Lane are signed, in 2019. Concurrently, he began touring with Lane and Mason Ramsey later in the year. Ernest had further success as a songwriter in 2020 with Lane's "Big, Big Plans", Morgan Wallen's "More Than My Hometown", and Sam Hunt's "Breaking Up Was Easy in the 90s". He also released his first single for Big Loud, titled "Cheers". This was followed in 2021 by two more singles; the first was "American Rust", issued in June. It was followed in December by "Flower Shops", a duet with Wallen.

Ernest also host his own podcast titled Just Being Ernest, in which he talks to other musicians about the music industry. The podcast first started April 19, 2020.

Discography

Studio albums

Singles

References

American country singer-songwriters
Big Loud artists
Country musicians from Tennessee
Country rap musicians
Living people
People from Nashville, Tennessee
Year of birth missing (living people)